The Pitman Vegetarian Hotel was a hotel that opened in 1898 in the County Buildings (now Grade II* listed), Corporation Street, Birmingham, England, as an expansion of a vegetarian restaurant on the same site. The manager was James Henry Cook. According to his daughter, Kathleen Keleny, it was named after Sir Isaac Pitman, then vice-president of the Vegetarian Society. It was still operating in the 1930s.

The same proprietor ran the Pitman Health Food Co. (also called Pitman Reform Food Stores) at Aston Brook Street, Birmingham, advertising in 1909 as "The Largest Health Food Dealers in the World". Selling direct and by mail order, it manufactured meat-free products including Pitman Sea-Side Paste, Pitman Savoury Nut Meat, Nuto Cream, Brazose Meat, Vigar Extract, Vegsal Soups and Fruitarian Cakes and wafers. It also sold cooking utensils such as the Pitman Steam Cooker, a multilevel boiler and steamer.

Mahatma Gandhi is known to have received jars of Nuto Cream and Nuto Cream Soup from the company.

After the War, Pitman Building's warren of rooms housed Chest Xray, and various voluntary organisations under the aegis of Birmingham Voluntary Service Council, and its General Secretary Michael C Matcham, including Citizens Advice Bureau, Visiting Service for Old People, Personal Service Committee (administering SSAFA funds), Byv, Adventure Camps, Spode Holidays, Rubella playschemes, Lee Bank Saturday playscheme.

See also
 Food and drink in Birmingham
 List of vegetarian restaurants

References

External links
History of James Henry Cook

GandhiServe Foundation: Correspondence : 1948 - 1969

Hotels in Birmingham, West Midlands
Vegetarian restaurants in the United Kingdom
History of Birmingham, West Midlands
Grade II* listed buildings in Birmingham
Defunct hotels in England